Prolutacea is a genus of fireflies in the family of beetles known as Lampyridae, containing a single described species, Prolutacea pulsator.

References

Further reading

 
 
 

Lampyridae
Lampyridae genera
Bioluminescent insects
Monotypic Elateriformia genera
Articles created by Qbugbot